The Bridges Shopping Centre, commonly known as ‘The Bridges’ is a shopping centre located in Sunderland, England. The centre was opened by Princess Royal, Anne in 1988.

Shops 
The center compromises 79 stores, including 2 anchor tenants, Primark and TK Maxx. There are also 9 food outlets on site, ranging from coffee shops to cafes, including a Greggs Cafe & Esquires Coffee branch.

As a result of Debenhams entering administration, their anchor outlet at the center closed in May 2021, which reduced the total number of anchors from 3 to 2.

In December 2021, the supermarket chain Tesco confirmed they would be closing the Tesco Express store located within the center in Summer 2022.  The store closed on 2 April 2022.

Car Parking 
The shopping center offers over 900 parking spaces in 2 car parks, a multi-story car park, and a rooftop car park.

Both car parks operate with an hourly charge the majority of the time, with the following exceptions: Sundays & Bank Holidays have a single charge for parking during the day (8 AM-6 PM), and free parking is available Thursday Evenings between 5:30 PM & 9:00 PM.

The car park was open 24 hours a day until May 2017.

Ownership 
Heron International owned the centre, until it was sold to Land Securities in 1993, for a reported £39 million. A further sale took place in 2014, which resulted in clients of AEW Europe acquiring the centre for £153 million. The centre continues to be owned by AEW Europe at present.

Development
In 2000, the ‘old central bus station’, adjacent to the center was demolished and the land was acquired. This land was used to create a significant expansion that almost doubled the size of the center, and made it fully covered. Previously some areas of the centre were not covered, resulting in the centre having the nickname of ‘Windy City’.

In September 2010, Land Securities announced a £15 million development to build a 3-story (60,000sq ft) Primark store. The store later opened in November 2012.

In May 2020, Next expanded their store by over 4,000sq ft from 10,221sq ft to 14,710sq ft. This was achieved by acquiring an adjoining vacant unit. This allowed them to open a new childrenswear section and expand their existing homewares selection.

Transport Links

Bus 
The nearest bus stops to the centre are Holmside and vine place, both located almost directly adjacent. Bus services run frequently throughout the North East to the centre, including the Coast & Country (8) provided by GoNorthEast (from Stanley, Durham) and the Black Cats (2) operating between Washington & Sunderland (via the centre).

Metro 
The nearest metro stations to the centre are Park Lane and Sunderland, which is also the town’s main railway station. Both Park Lane and Sunderland are located less than one mile away. Onward journeys by foot take around 5–10 minutes.

References

External links
The Bridges Shopping Centre - Official Website

Shopping centres in Tyne and Wear
Buildings and structures in the City of Sunderland